The Cadillac Catera is a four-door, five passenger, rear-wheel drive luxury sedan marketed from 1996 until 2001 by Cadillac over a single generation in the United States.  As a rebadged variant of the Opel Omega B, the Catera was manufactured by Opel in Rüsselsheim, Germany, shared GM's GM V platform and reached a production of approximately 95,000 over five model years.

History

The Catera was first introduced in the United States in 1994 as the Cadillac LSE concept car, a new entry level model for Cadillac that would compete with sedans from Acura, BMW, Infiniti, Lexus, and Mercedes-Benz.  Cadillac eventually began selling the Catera in the United States in the fall of 1996 as a 1997 model with a base price of $29,995.

Some of the standard features on the Catera included cloth interior, front bucket seats, dual-zone automatic climate control, AM/FM stereo radio with cassette player and eight-speaker sound system, airbags, anti-lock brakes, traction control, keyless entry, security system, alloy wheels, compact spare tire, and full instrumentation. Optional equipment included leather interior, heated seats, cassette player and CD player combination, Bose premium sound system, power sunroof, Homelink, OnStar, and chrome wheels. 

A Sport model was offered beginning in 1999 with eight-way power adjustable seats, heated front seats, 17-inch wheels, driver's seat memory, audible theft-deterrent system, three-channel garage door opener, high-intensity discharge headlamps, and a rear spoiler.  The Catera received a facelift in 2000 with revised nose, tail, wheels, interior trim, mirrors, optional HID headlamps, stiffer suspension settings, and side airbags.

The model's engine was a  54° L81 V6 manufactured in England at GM's Ellesmere Port facility, using an  FR layout.  The GM 4L30-E automatic transmission was manufactured at GM's plant in Strasbourg, France.

Marketing

Catera launch marketing used the tagline "the Caddy that zigs," with advertising featuring supermodel Cindy Crawford and a small animated bird named "Ziggy," a reference to the heraldic merlettes (adaptations of the martin, without legs or beaks) featured in the various iterations of Cadillac's logo from its inception through 1999.  Ziggy was featured in Catera marketing through model year 1998, with Cadillac saying: 
"like Catera, Ziggy was hatched in Germany and has the sole mission of bringing fun to the luxury of Cadillac.  He was one of six mythical, beakless, footless martins or 'Merlettes' in the Cadillac Crest before we gave him big feet, a giant beak, and turned him around. He's quite a departure from his five brothers who have been part of the Cadillac Crest since the days of the crusades when the crest was the proud symbol of Le Sieur Antoine de la Mothe Cadillac Family."

In 1997, John Tinker, a producer of television medical drama Chicago Hope, was inspired by an inadvertent pun in a Catera commercial, saying "Who is Lisa Catera?" — in response to the Catera tagline "Lease a Catera."  He introduced a character named Dr. Lisa Catera, played by Stacy Edwards. Coincidentally, the main demographic of Chicago Hope viewers were exactly the same demographic Cadillac hoped to attract with the Catera, and Cadillac/General Motors management responded extremely positively to the reference, becoming the main advertiser on the show and giving Edwards a complimentary three-year lease on a Catera. In one episode, Edwards' character said "when you can't zig, you zag," a reference to the Catera's original marketing tagline.

Related vehicles
A close relative of the Catera, utilizing the same platform, continued to be in production until 2006. In the US market, the platform was used for the Pontiac GTO, which was an almost identical derivative of the Holden Monaro coupe. Both were manufactured by GM Holden in Australia. These performance coupes were themselves derived from the sedan platform that originated in the Australian market as the VT-series Holden Commodore in 1997. The European version, known as the Opel Omega, also sold in the UK as a Vauxhall was discontinued in 2003.

Yearly American sales

References

Catera
Rear-wheel-drive vehicles
Executive cars
Mid-size cars
Sedans
2000s cars
Cars introduced in 1996